The Ozidi Saga is a choreographed folklore epic performed as part of the oral history of the Ijaw of the Niger River Delta.

It is traditionally performed as a periodic festival honoring the folk hero Ozidi. The performance dramatizes key episodes in the myth danced in a nonlinear narrative, allowing a ritual officiant dressed in white and holding objects traditionally identified with the hero to solicit participation by acolytes and members of the audience. A performance in 1966 was filmed and later transcribed and translated by playwright and poet John Pepper Clark.

References 
Okpewho, Isidore. 2014. Blood on the Tides: The Ozidi Saga and Oral Epic Narratology. Rochester: University of Rochester Press. 279 pages.  
Okpewho, Isidore. The Art of The Ozidi Saga. Research in African Literatures Volume 34, Number 3.
Clark-Bekederemo J. P. (trans.) The Ozidi Saga. Howard University Press 1991 .

Nigerian culture
Epic poems